Boucotte Diola is a settlement in Senegal. At the time of the last  census, there were 197 inhabitants, 27 households, and no modern well. The inhabitants speak the Kwatay language, one of the Jola languages.

It hosts the Boucotte Sangawatt Museum, an open-air museum dedicated to the culture of the Jola people.

References

External links

PEPAM

Populated places in Senegal